Provincial Road 212 (PR 212) is a provincial road in the Canadian province of Manitoba.

Route description
PR 212 begins at PR 204 between Selkirk and East Selkirk and heads east through East Selkirk to Provincial Trunk Highway 59 (PTH 59). From PTH 59, it continues east and then turns south to PTH 44. From PTH 44, it heads south through Cooks Creek before ending at PR 213 (Garven Road).  PR 212 is a paved highway west of PTH 59 and south of PTH 44. The remainder is a gravel road.

Along PR 212 near Cooks Creek is the Immaculate Conception Ukrainian Catholic Church, a Provincial Heritage Site.

References

External links
Official Manitoba Highway Map

212